Juan  Carlos I (Juan Carlos Alfonso Víctor María de Borbón y Borbón-Dos Sicilias, born 5 January 1938) is a member of the Spanish royal family who reigned as King of Spain from 22 November 1975 until his abdication on 19 June 2014.

Juan Carlos is the grandson of Alfonso XIII, the last king of Spain before the abolition of the monarchy in 1931 and the subsequent declaration of the Second Spanish Republic. Juan Carlos was born in Rome during his family's exile. Francisco Franco took over the government of Spain after his victory in the Spanish Civil War in 1939, yet in 1947 Spain's status as a monarchy was affirmed and a law was passed allowing Franco to choose his successor. Juan Carlos's father, Infante Juan, Count of Barcelona, was the third son of King Alfonso XIII and assumed his claims to the throne after Alfonso died in February 1941. However, Franco saw Juan to be too liberal and in 1969 declared Juan Carlos his successor as head of state.

Juan Carlos spent his early years in Italy and came to Spain in 1947 to continue his studies. After completing his secondary education in 1955, he began his military training and entered the General Military Academy at Zaragoza. Later, he attended the Naval Military School and the General Academy of the Air, and finished his tertiary education at the University of Madrid. In 1962, Juan Carlos married Princess Sophia of Greece and Denmark in Athens. The couple had two daughters and a son together: Elena, Cristina, and Felipe. Due to Franco's declining health, Juan Carlos first began periodically acting as Spain's head of state in the summer of 1974. Franco died in November the following year and Juan Carlos became king on 22 November 1975, two days after Franco's death, the first reigning monarch since 1931, although his exiled father did not formally renounce his claims to the throne in favor of his son until 1977.

Juan Carlos was expected to continue Franco's legacy. However, Juan Carlos introduced reforms to dismantle the Francoist regime and to begin the Spanish transition to democracy soon after his accession. This led to the approval of the Spanish Constitution of 1978 in a referendum which re-established a constitutional monarchy. In 1981, Juan Carlos played a major role in preventing a coup that attempted to revert Spain to Francoist government in the King's name. In 2008, he was considered the most popular leader in all Ibero-America. Hailed for his role in Spain's transition to democracy, the King and the monarchy's reputation began to suffer after controversies surrounding his family arose, exacerbated by the public controversy centering on an elephant-hunting trip he undertook during a time of financial crisis in Spain.

In June 2014, Juan Carlos, citing personal reasons, abdicated in favour of his son, who acceded to the throne as Felipe VI. Since August 2020, Juan Carlos has lived in self-imposed exile from Spain over allegedly improper ties to business deals in Saudi Arabia.

Early life (1938–1969) 
Juan Carlos Alfonso Víctor María was born to Infante Juan, Count of Barcelona, and Princess María de las Mercedes of Bourbon-Two Sicilies in their family home in Rome, where his grandfather King Alfonso XIII of Spain and other members of the Spanish royal family lived in exile following the proclamation of the Second Spanish Republic in 1931. He was baptized as Juan Carlos Alfonso Víctor María de Borbón y Borbón-Dos Sicilias by Cardinal Eugenio Pacelli, the future Pope Pius XII.

His early life was dictated largely by the political concerns of his father and General Franco. He moved to Spain in 1948 to be educated there after his father persuaded Franco to allow it. He began his studies in San Sebastián and finished them in 1954 at the Instituto San Isidro in Madrid. He then joined the army, doing his officer training from 1955 to 1957 at the Military Academy of Zaragoza.
According to his sister Pilar, he had difficulty in his studies because of dyslexia.

He has two sisters: Infanta Pilar, Duchess of Badajoz (1936–2020); and Infanta Margarita, Duchess of Soria (born 1939). He also had a younger brother, Alfonso.

The rendering of his name as "Juan Carlos" (the first and second particles of his baptismal name) was a modification by choice of Francisco Franco. He was always known in his familiar circle simply as "Juan" or "Juanito".

Brother's death
On the evening of Holy Thursday, 29 March 1956, Juan Carlos's younger brother Alfonso died in a gun accident at the family's home Villa Giralda in Estoril, on the Portuguese Riviera. The Spanish Embassy in Portugal then issued the following official communiqué:

Alfonso had won a local junior golf tournament earlier in the day, then went to evening Mass and rushed up to the room to see Juan Carlos who had come home for the Easter holidays from military school. Both Juan Carlos, age 18, and Alfonso, age 14, had been apparently playing with a .22 caliber Long Automatic Star revolver owned by Alfonso. As they were alone in the room, it is unclear how Alfonso was shot, but according to Josefina Carolo, dressmaker to Juan Carlos's mother, Juan Carlos pointed the pistol at Alfonso and pulled the trigger, unaware that it was loaded. Bernardo Arnoso, a Portuguese friend of Juan Carlos, also said that Juan Carlos had told him he had fired the pistol not knowing that it was loaded, and adding that the bullet ricocheted off a wall, hitting Alfonso in the face. Helena Matheopoulos, a Greek author who spoke with Juan Carlos's sister Pilar, said that Alfonso had been out of the room and when he returned and pushed the door open, the door knocked Juan Carlos in the arm, causing him to fire the pistol.

After learning this news, his father Juan of Bourbon reportedly grabbed Juan Carlos by the neck and shouted at him angrily, "Swear to me that you didn't do it on purpose!" Two days later, he sent him back to the military academy. Following a later declaration of María de las Mercedes, Paul Preston argues that the content of the former testimony implies that Juan Carlos had pointed the gun at Alfonso, apparently not knowing that the gun was loaded, and pulled the trigger.

Education 
In 1957, Juan Carlos spent a year in the naval school at Marín, Pontevedra, and another in the Air Force school in San Javier in Murcia. In 1960–61, he studied law, international political economy and public finance at the University of Madrid. He then went to live in the Palace of Zarzuela and began carrying out official engagements.

Marriage 

Juan Carlos was married in Athens on 14 May 1962, to Princess Sophia of Greece and Denmark, daughter of King Paul of Greece, firstly in a Roman Catholic ceremony at the Church of St. Denis, followed by a Greek Orthodox ceremony at the Metropolitan Cathedral of Athens. She converted from Greek Orthodoxy to Roman Catholicism. They had three children: Elena (b. 1963), Cristina (b. 1965) and Felipe (b. 1968).

Prince of Spain (1969–1975) 

The dictatorial regime of Francisco Franco came to power during the Spanish Civil War, which pitted a government of democrats, anarchists, socialists, and communists, supported by the Soviet Union and international volunteers, against a rebellion of conservatives, monarchists, nationalists, and fascists, supported by both Hitler and Mussolini, with the rebels ultimately winning. Franco's authoritarian government remained dominant in Spain until the 1960s. With Franco's increasing age, left-wing protests increased, while at the same time, the far right factions demanded the return of a hardline absolute monarchy. At the time, the heir to the throne of Spain was Infante Juan, Count of Barcelona, the son of the late Alfonso XIII. However, General Franco viewed him with extreme suspicion, believing him to be a liberal who was opposed to his regime.

Juan Carlos's first cousin Alfonso, Duke of Anjou and Cádiz was also briefly considered as a candidate. Alfonso was known to be an ardent Francoist and married Franco's granddaughter, Doña María del Carmen Martínez-Bordiú y Franco in 1972.

Ultimately, Franco decided to skip a generation and name Juan de Borbón's son, Prince Juan Carlos, as his personal successor. Franco hoped the young prince could be groomed to take over the nation while still maintaining the ultraconservative and authoritarian nature of his regime. In 1969, Juan Carlos was officially designated heir-apparent and was given the new title of Prince of Spain (not the traditional Prince of Asturias). As a condition of being named heir-apparent, he was required to swear loyalty to Franco's Movimiento Nacional, which he did with little outward hesitation. His choice was ratified by the Spanish parliament on 22 July 1969.

Juan Carlos met and consulted Franco many times while heir apparent and often took part in official and ceremonial state functions, standing alongside the dictator, much to the anger of hardline republicans and more moderate liberals, who hoped that Franco's death would bring in an era of reform. During 1969–1975, Juan Carlos publicly supported Franco's regime. Although Franco's health worsened during those years, whenever he did appear in public, from state dinners to military parades, it was in Juan Carlos's company. Juan Carlos continued to praise Franco and his government for the economic growth and positive changes in Spain. However, as the years progressed, Juan Carlos began meeting secretly with political opposition leaders and exiles, who were fighting to bring liberal reform to the country. He also had secret conversations with his father over the telephone. Franco, for his part, remained largely oblivious to the prince's actions and denied allegations from his ministers and advisors that Juan Carlos was in any way disloyal to his vision of the regime.

During periods of Franco's temporary incapacity in 1974 and 1975, Juan Carlos was acting head of state. On 30 October 1975, Franco gave full control to Juan Carlos. According to declassified CIA reports, during this time Juan Carlos secretly acquiesced and arranged with Moroccan king Hassan II the terms of the so-called Green March, the partial invasion of the Spanish Sahara by Moroccan civilians, followed by the Madrid Accords handing over the control of the territory to Morocco and Mauritania.

Reign (1975–2014) 

Franco died on 20 November 1975, and two days later on 22 November the Cortes Españolas proclaimed Juan Carlos King of Spain. In his address to the Cortes, Juan Carlos spoke of three factors: historical tradition, national laws, and the will of the people, and in so doing referred to a process dating back to the Civil War of 1936–39. He swore using the following formula: "I swear to God and the Gospels to comply and enforce compliance to the Fundamental Laws of the Realm and to remain loyal to the Principles of the National Movement".

On 27 November, a Mass of the Holy Spirit was celebrated in the church of San Jerónimo el Real in Madrid to inaugurate his reign. He opted not to call himself Juan III or Carlos V, but Juan Carlos I. Juan Carlos is reported to have been pressured by Valéry Giscard d'Estaing to personally tell Chilean dictator Augusto Pinochet, who had traveled to Spain for Franco's funeral, not to attend his inauguration.

Transition 

Juan Carlos's accession met with relatively little parliamentary opposition. Some members of the Movimiento Nacional voted against recognizing him, and even more voted against the 1976 Law for Political Reform. But a majority of Movimiento members supported both measures. Juan Carlos quickly instituted reforms, to the great displeasure of Falangist and conservative (monarchist) elements, especially in the military, who had expected him to maintain the authoritarian state.  

In July 1976, Juan Carlos dismissed prime minister Carlos Arias Navarro, who had been attempting to continue Francoist policies in the face of the King's attempts at democratization. He instead appointed Adolfo Suárez, a former leader of the Movimiento Nacional, as prime minister, who went on to win the following year's election and become the first democratically elected leader of the new regime.

Further legitimacy was restored to Juan Carlos's position on 14 May 1977, when his father (whom many monarchists had recognized as the legitimate, exiled King of Spain during the Franco era) formally renounced his claim to the throne and recognized his son as the sole head of the Spanish Royal House, transferring to him the historical heritage of the Spanish monarchy, thus making Juan Carlos both de facto and de jure king in the eyes of the traditional monarchists.

On 20 May 1977, the leader of the only recently legalized Spanish Socialist Workers' Party (PSOE), Felipe González, accompanied by Javier Solana, visited Juan Carlos in the Zarzuela Palace. The event represented a key endorsement of the monarchy from Spain's political left, who had been historically republican. Left-wing support for the monarchy grew when the Communist Party of Spain was legalized shortly thereafter, a move Juan Carlos had pressed for, despite enormous right-wing military opposition at that time, during the Cold War.

On 15 June 1977, Spain held its first post-Franco democratic elections. Juan Carlos had played a role as middleman in order to channel $10 million from the Shah of Iran to Adolfo Suárez's election campaign, reportedly asking the Shah for the money to "save Spain from Marxism".

In 1978, the government promulgated a new constitution that acknowledged Juan Carlos as rightful heir of the Spanish dynasty and king; specifically, Title II, Section 57 asserted Juan Carlos's right to the throne of Spain by dynastic succession in the Bourbon tradition, as "the legitimate heir of the historic dynasty" rather than as the designated successor of Franco. The Constitution was passed by the democratically elected Constituent Cortes, ratified by the people in a referendum (6 December) and then signed into law by the King before a solemn meeting of the Cortes.

1981 coup d'état attempt 

An attempted military coup, known as 23-F, occurred on 23 February 1981, when the Cortes were seized by members of the Guardia Civil in the parliamentary chamber.  During the coup, the King, wearing his uniform as Captain-General of the Armed Forces, gave a public television broadcast calling for unambiguous support for the legitimate democratic government. The broadcast is believed to have been a major factor in foiling the coup. The coup leaders had promised many of their potential supporters that they were acting in the King's name and with his approval, but were unable to demonstrate either, and the broadcast – coming just after midnight on the night of the coup – definitively showed the King's opposition to the coup makers.

When Juan Carlos became king, Communist leader Santiago Carrillo nicknamed him Juan Carlos the Brief, predicting that the monarchy would soon be swept away with the other remnants of the Franco era. After the collapse of the attempted coup, however, in an emotional statement, Carrillo remarked: "Today, we are all monarchists." Public support for the monarchy among democrats and leftists before 1981 had been limited; following the king's handling of the coup it increased significantly.

Later role in Spanish politics 

The victory of the PSOE in 1982 under González marked the effective end of the King's active involvement in Spanish politics. González governed for 14 years, longer than any other democratically elected Prime Minister. His administration helped consolidate Spanish democracy and thus maintained the stability of the nation.

On paper, Juan Carlos retained fairly extensive reserve powers.  He was the guardian of the Constitution and was responsible for ensuring that it was obeyed. In practice, since the passage of the Constitution (and especially since 1982), he took a mostly non-partisan and representative role, acting almost entirely on the advice of the government. However, he commanded great moral authority as an essential symbol of the country's unity.

Under the Constitution, the King has immunity from prosecution in matters relating to his official duties. Consequently, he exercised most of his powers through the ministers; his acts as King (and not as a citizen) were not valid unless countersigned by a minister, who became politically responsible for the act in question.

The honour of the royal family is specifically protected from insult by the Spanish Penal Code. Under this protection, Basque independentist Arnaldo Otegi and cartoonists from El Jueves were tried and punished.

The King gives an annual speech to the nation on Christmas Eve. He is the commander-in-chief of the Spanish armed forces.

In October 1990, Juan Carlos visited the Chilean city of Valdivia amidst the beginning of the Chilean transition to democracy. While he and the Queen were cheered by some, groups of indigenous Mapuches approached the king some to protest past colonialism and others to have the King ratify past Mapuche-Spanish treaties. According to El País political infighting between Mapuches prevented Juan Carlos from hosting an official meeting with Mapuche representatives.

In July 2000, Juan Carlos was the target of an enraged protester when former priest Juan María Fernández y Krohn, who had once attacked Pope John Paul II, breached security and attempted to approach the king.

When the media asked Juan Carlos in 2005 whether he would endorse the bill legalising same-sex marriage that was then being debated in the Cortes Generales, he answered "Soy el Rey de España y no el de Bélgica" ("I am the King of Spain, not of Belgium")a reference to King Baudouin of Belgium, who had refused to sign the Belgian law legalising abortion. The King gave his Royal Assent to Law 13/2005 on 1 July 2005; the law legalising same-sex marriage was gazetted in the Boletín Oficial del Estado on 2 July, and came into effect on 3 July.

According to a poll in the newspaper El Mundo in November 2005, 77.5% of Spaniards thought Juan Carlos was "good or very good", 15.4% "not so good", and only 7.1% "bad or very bad". Even so, the issue of the monarchy re-emerged on 28 September 2007 as photos of the king were burnt in public in Catalonia by small groups of protesters wanting the restoration of the Republic.

2007 Ibero-American Summit 

In November 2007, at the Ibero-American Summit in Santiago de Chile, during a heated exchange, Juan Carlos interrupted Venezuelan President Hugo Chávez, saying, "¿Por qué no te callas?" ("Why don't you shut up?"). Chávez had been interrupting the Spanish Prime Minister, José Luis Rodríguez Zapatero, while the latter was defending his predecessor and political opponent, José María Aznar, after Chávez had referred to Aznar as a fascist and "less human than snakes". The King shortly afterwards left the hall when President Daniel Ortega of Nicaragua accused Spain of intervention in his country's elections and complained about some Spanish energy companies working in Nicaragua. This was an unprecedented diplomatic incident and a rare display of public anger by the King.

Budget of the royal house 
Juan Carlos detailed for the first time in 2011 the yearly royal budget of €8.3 million, excluding expenses such as the electricity bill, paid by the State.

Botswana hunting trip 
In April 2012, Juan Carlos faced criticism for an elephant-hunting trip in Botswana. The public found out about the trip only after the King injured himself and a special aircraft was sent to bring him home. Spanish officials stated that the expenses of the trip were not paid by taxpayers or by the palace, but by Mohamed Eyad Kayali, a businessman of Syrian origin. Cayo Lara Moya of the United Left party said the King's trip "demonstrated a lack of ethics and respect toward many people in this country who are suffering a lot" while Tomás Gómez of the Socialist party said Juan Carlos should choose between "public responsibilities or an abdication". In April 2012, Spain's unemployment was at 23% and nearly 50% for young workers. El País estimated the total cost of a hunting trip at €44,000, about twice the average annual salary in Spain. A petition called for the king to resign from his position as honorary president of the Spanish branch of the World Wide Fund for Nature. The WWF itself responded by asking for an interview with the King to resolve the situation. In July 2012, WWF-Spain held a meeting in Madrid and decided with 226 votes to 13 to remove the King from its honorary presidency. He later apologised for the hunting trip.

Up until the Botswana elephant trip, Juan Carlos had enjoyed a high level of shielding from media scrutiny, described as "rare among Western leaders".

Abdication 

Spanish news media speculated about the King's future in early 2014, following public criticism over his taking an elephant hunting safari in Botswana and an embezzlement scandal involving his daughter Cristina, and her husband Iñaki Urdangarin. The King's chief of staff denied in a briefing that the "abdication option" was being considered. On the morning of 2 June 2014, Prime Minister Mariano Rajoy made a televised announcement that the King had told him of his intention to abdicate. Later, the King delivered a televised address and announced that he would abdicate the throne in favour of the Prince of Asturias. Royal officials described the King's choice as a personal decision which he had been contemplating since his 76th birthday at the start of the year. The King reportedly said, "No queremos que mi hijo se marchite esperando como el príncipe Carlos." (English: "We do not want my son to wither waiting like Prince Charles.") As required by the Spanish constitution, any abdication would be settled by means of an organic law. A draft law was passed with 299 in favour, 19 against and 23 abstaining. On 18 June, he signed the organic law passed by parliament several hours before his abdication took effect. Felipe was enthroned on 19 June 2014, and Juan Carlos's granddaughter Leonor became the new Princess of Asturias. Juan Carlos was the fourth European monarch to abdicate in just over a year, following Pope Benedict XVI (28 February 2013), Queen Beatrix of the Netherlands (30 April 2013), and King Albert II of Belgium (21 July 2013).

The Spanish constitution at the time of the abdication did not grant an abdicated monarch the legal immunity of a head of state, but the government changed the law to allow this. However, unlike his previous immunity, the new legislation left him accountable to the supreme court, in a similar type of protection afforded to many high-ranking civil servants and politicians in Spain. The legislation stipulates that all outstanding legal matters relating to the former king be suspended and passed "immediately" to the supreme court.

Reactions 

The Spanish press gave the announcement a broadly positive reception, but described the moment as an "institutional crisis" and "a very important moment in the history of democratic Spain". Around Spain and in major cities (including London) the news was met by republican celebration and protests, calling for the end of the monarchy.

Catalan leader Artur Mas said that the news of the King's abdication would not slow down the process of independence for Catalonia. Iñigo Urkullu, the President of the Basque government, concluded that the King's reign was "full of light yet also darkness" and said that his successor Felipe should remember that "the Basque Question has not been resolved". Other regional leaders had more positive evaluations of Juan Carlos following his decision to abdicate: Alberto Núñez Feijóo of Galicia called him "the King of Democracy" who "guaranteed the continuation of constitutional monarchy" and Alberto Fabra of the Valencian Community said that Spaniards are proud of their king who had been "at the forefront of protecting our interests inside and outside of our borders".

British Prime Minister David Cameron stated: "I would like to use this opportunity to make a tribute to King Juan Carlos, who has done so much during his reign to aid the successful Spanish transition to democracy, and has been a great friend of the United Kingdom." The President of the European Commission, José Manuel Barroso, said that Juan Carlos was a "believer in Europeanism and modernity...without whom one could not understand modern Spain".

The Spanish public also gave a broadly positive opinion not only of the abdication but of his reign as a whole. According to a poll taken by El Mundo, 65% saw the King's reign as either good or very good, up from 41.3%. Overall, 55.7% of those polled in the 3–5 June survey by Sigma Dos supported the institution of the monarchy in Spain, up from 49.9% when the same question was posed six months prior. 57.5% believed the Prince could restore the royal family's lost prestige. An overwhelming majority of Spaniards believed the new King, Felipe VI, would make a good monarch and more than three-quarters believed King Juan Carlos had been right to hand over the throne to his son.

Retirement 
Juan Carlos continued to have a role as institutional representative. In December 2015, Juan Carlos attended the inauguration of Mauricio Macri as President of Argentina as top Spanish representative. He announced by a letter to his son Felipe that his intention to retire from public life on 2 June 2019. In June 2019, the former King announced his retirement from official duties.

Corruption investigations

2020 Saudi rail deal 

Recordings of the former King's alleged mistress Corinna zu Sayn-Wittgenstein-Sayn speaking with a former police chief were leaked to the press in mid-2018. Sayn-Wittgenstein claimed that Juan Carlos received kick-backs from commercial contracts in the Gulf States – particularly in the late-2000s construction of the €6.7 billion Haramain high-speed railway in Saudi Arabia – and maintained these proceeds in a bank account in Switzerland. She alleged that he purchased properties in Monaco under her name to circumvent the tax treatment of lawful residents, stating "[not] because he [loved] me a lot, but because I reside in Monaco." She further claimed the head of the Spanish intelligence service warned her that her life, and those of her children, would be at risk if she spoke of their association. The allegations drew demands for Juan Carlos to be investigated for corruption in early June 2019.

Swiss authorities began investigating Juan Carlos in March 2020 in relation to a $100 million gift to Sayn-Wittgenstein in 2012. This donation was linked to alleged kick-back fees from Saudi Arabia. Sayn-Wittgenstein reportedly told the head Swiss prosecutor on 19 December 2018 that Juan Carlos had given her €65 million out of "gratitude and love", to guarantee her future and her children's, because "he still had hopes to win her back". A letter written by Juan Carlos to his Swiss lawyers in 2018 stated the gift was irrevocable, despite his having asked in 2014 for the return of the money. On 14 March 2020, The Telegraph reported that his son Felipe, King of Spain since 2014, appeared as second beneficiary (after Juan Carlos) of the Lucum Foundation, which had received a €65 million donation by King Abdullah of Saudi Arabia. On 15 March 2020, the Royal Household declared that Felipe VI would renounce any inheritance from his father. Additionally, the Household announced that the former king would lose his public stipend from the State's General Budget.

In June 2020, the public prosecutor's office of the Supreme Court of Spain agreed to investigate Juan Carlos's role as facilitator in Phase II of the high speed rail connecting Mecca and Medina, intending to determine the criminal relevance of events that took place after his abdication in June 2014. As King of Spain, Juan Carlos was immune from prosecution from 1975 to 2014 by sovereign immunity.

A further investigation by Swiss authorities was undertaken regarding €3.5 million paid from the Lucum Foundation to the Bahamas-based bank Pictet & Ciein for a society called Dolphin, which was controlled by the lawyer Dante Canónica, who also controlled Lucum.

In December 2021, the Swiss prosecutors dropped all cases due to the impossibility of proving any illegality.

Credit cards and bank accounts
Spanish prosecutors opened an investigation into the use by Juan Carlos and other members of the royal family of credit cards used between 2016 and 2018 which were paid for by an overseas account to which neither Juan Carlos nor any member of the royal family were signatories, leading to accusations that the funds are undisclosed assets of Juan Carlos, and as the card drawings exceeded €120,000 in one year, comprised undisclosed income and was therefore a tax offence in Spain. Mexican millionaire and investment banker Allen Sanginés-Krause has been named as the owner of the cards, a friend of Juan Carlos to whom he donated sums of money using Air Force Colonel Nicolás Murga Mendoza as an intermediary.

In December 2020, Juan Carlos reportedly paid 678,393.72 euros to Spain's tax agency for the concept of defrauded money in an affair of "opaque credit cards" used between 2016 and 2018 by himself, his wife and some grandchildren, intending to avoid further scrutiny from the Supreme Court's prosecutor, the payment being an admission of fraud.

Swiss and Spanish prosecutors also investigated several accounts related to the former King, such as an account in Switzerland with almost €8 million and an attempt to withdraw nearly €10 million from Jersey, possibly from a trust set up by or for Juan Carlos in the 1990s. Juan Carlos claims he is "not responsible for any Jersey trust and never has been, either directly or indirectly".

In March 2022, Spanish prosecutors closed all cases against him following the same decision from Swiss prosecutors in December 2021.

Zagatka Foundation
Founded in Liechtenstein in 2003 and owned by Álvaro de Orleans-Borbón, a distant cousin of Juan Carlos who lives in Monaco received a large sum of money from Switzerland, Juan Carlos is named as the third beneficiary. In 2009 Álvaro de Orleans-Borbón paid a cheque from Mexico for €4.3 million into the account which the Swiss adjudicated belonged to Juan Carlos. Juan Carlos appears to have drawn down funds from the Zagatka foundation to spend €8 million between 2009 and 2018 on private flights, with Air Partner receiving around €6.1 million. Zagatka used commissions due to Juan Carlos and paid to Zagatka to invest millions, mainly in Ibex35 companies between 2003 and 2018.

On 25 February 2021, Juan Carlos paid 4 million euros to the Spanish Tax Agency to avoid new tax offenses in relation with these flights.

Lucum foundation
A Panamanian Lucum foundation had Juan Carlos as the first beneficiary and King Felipe VI as a named second beneficiary, although King Felipe VI has subsequently relinquished any inheritance from his father Juan Carlos. Lucum received $100 million from the Saudi royal house in 2008. Swiss prosecutors are concerned about who at the Swiss bank, Mirabaud & Cie, knows who the account was for and what was discovered about the source of the funds from the Ministry of Finance of Saudi Arabia. They are also concerned about a transfer of €3.5m from Lucum to an account held by Dante Canónica in the Bahamas. In 2012 the Mirabaud bank, which had concealed from its employees the beneficial owner of the account, asked for the account to be closed, due to possible adverse publicity; this was when the bulk of the funds were transferred to Corinna zu Sayn-Wittgenstein-Sayn.

Relocation abroad

On 3 August 2020, the Palace of Zarzuela announced Juan Carlos wished to relocate from Spain because of increased media press about his business dealings in Saudi Arabia and left a letter to his son saying so. By the time the letter had been made public, he had already left the country. Journalists speculated that he might have fled to the Dominican Republic, Portugal, France, and Italy, and, later, as of 7 August, the Emirates Palace in Abu Dhabi. The Royal Household initially declined requests to publicly disclose Juan Carlos's location; on 17 August, the Royal Household confirmed that, since 3 August, Juan Carlos was in the United Arab Emirates, where he arrived by taking a private plane from Vigo Airport.

Family and private life 
Juan Carlos and Sofía have two daughters and one son:
 Infanta Elena, Duchess of Lugo (born 20 December 1963)
 Infanta Cristina (born 13 June 1965)
 King Felipe VI of Spain (born 30 January 1968)

Juan Carlos is also the alleged father of Alberto Solà Jimenez, born in Barcelona in 1956, also of a woman born in Catalonia in 1964, and of Ingrid Sartiau, a Belgian woman born in 1966 who has filed a paternity suit, but complete sovereign immunity prevented that suit prior to his abdication. Juan Carlos  had several extramarital affairs, which adversely affected his marriage.

In 1972, Juan Carlos, a keen sailor, competed in the Dragon class event at the Olympic Games, finishing 15th. During their summer holidays, the whole family spends time at Marivent Palace (Palma de Mallorca) and on the yacht Fortuna, where they would take part in sailing competitions. The king has manned the Bribón series of yachts. In winter, the family often went skiing in Baqueira-Beret and Candanchú (Pyrenees). At present, his hobbies include classic sailing boats.

Juan Carlos also hunts bears; in October 2004, he angered environmental activists by killing nine bears in central Romania, one of which was pregnant. It was alleged by the Russian regional authorities that in August 2006 Juan Carlos shot a drunken tame bear (Mitrofan the Bear) during a private hunting trip to Russia; the Office of the Spanish Monarchy denied this claim.

Juan Carlos is a member of the World Scout Foundation and of the Sons of the American Revolution.

Health

A benign 17–19 mm tumour was removed under general anaesthetic from King Juan Carlos's right lung in an operation carried out in the Hospital Clínic de Barcelona in May 2010. The operation followed an annual check-up, and Juan Carlos was not expected to need any further treatment.

In April 2012, the King underwent surgery for a triple fracture of the hip at the San Jose Hospital, Madrid, following a fall on a private elephant-hunting trip to Botswana. He also underwent a hip operation in September 2013 at Madrid's Quirón hospital. In April 2018, Juan Carlos was admitted to hospital for a surgery on his right knee.

On 24 August 2019 he had heart surgery.

In popular culture 
His life between 1948 and 1993 is dealt in the 2014 miniseries .

As of 2021, there are 4 simultaneous television projects in development set to portray the former king, some of which span along a wider time period of the Royal Household: Palacio real. Brillo y tragedia de la monarquía española (Diagonal TV), El rey (The Mediapro Studio), El emérito (Mandarina Producciones) and XRey (Starzplay, Sony Pictures TV and The Weekend Studio).

Titles, styles, honours and arms 

In 1969, Juan Carlos was named as General Franco's successor and was given the title of 'Prince of Spain'. Upon the death of Franco in 1975, Juan Carlos acceded to the throne of Spain. The current Spanish constitution refers to the monarch by the simple title "King of Spain". Aside from this title, the constitution allows for the use of other historic titles pertaining to the Spanish monarchy, without specifying them. This was also reiterated by a decree promulgated on 6 November 1987 concerning titles of members of the royal family. Since his abdication in 2014, King Juan Carlos has retained, by courtesy, the title and style of king that he enjoyed during his reign.

Arms

Ancestry

See also 

 List of honours of the Spanish Royal Family by country
 Line of succession to the Spanish throne

Notes

Notes

References

Citations

Sources

Further reading 
 Paul Preston, Juan Carlos: Steering Spain from Dictatorship to Democracy, W W Norton & Co Inc, June 2004. .
 Ronald Hilton, SPAIN: King Juan Carlos.
 Vilallonga, José Luis de, The King, Orion Publishing, 1994. 
 Wilsford, David, ed. Political leaders of contemporary Western Europe: a biographical dictionary (Greenwood, 1995) pp. 207–15.

External links 

 Official website of the Spanish Royal Family
 Full text of the King's broadcast regarding his abdication
 Organic Law approving Juan Carlos's abdication, published in the Boletin Oficial del Estado
 Juan Carlos I abdicates (2 June 2014)
 Biography by CIDOB

 
1938 births
20th-century Roman Catholics
20th-century Spanish monarchs
21st-century Roman Catholics
21st-century Spanish monarchs
Air captain generals
Captain generals of the Navy
Claimant Kings of Jerusalem
Fellows of Fitzwilliam College, Cambridge
Francoist Spain
Fratricides
House of Bourbon (Spain)
Hunters
Living people
Monarchs who abdicated
Royal Olympic participants
Olympic sailors of Spain
Recipients of the Four Freedoms Award
Sailors at the 1972 Summer Olympics – Dragon
Sons of the American Revolution
Spanish captain generals
Spanish male karateka
Spanish male sailors (sport)
Spanish Roman Catholics
Spanish transition to democracy
Navarrese titular monarchs
Recipients of the Medal of the Oriental Republic of Uruguay
Recipients of the Order of the Star of Romania
International Simón Bolívar Prize recipients
Recipients of the Order of Prince Yaroslav the Wise, 1st class
Spanish expatriates in Portugal
Spanish expatriates in the United Arab Emirates
Grand Collars of the Order of Lakandula
Nansen Refugee Award laureates